The Barrier is an active shield volcano located in the north of Kenya. It is last known to have erupted in 1921.

Description

The volcanic complex consists of four distinct volcanoes. From west to east these are Kalolenyang, Kakorinya, Likaiu West and Likaiu East. The foundation rocks are mainly basalt. About 90% of the volume is trachyte.

Kakorinya is the youngest of the group and forms the center of the complex, with a well-preserved circular crater that has not been breached.
Much of the floor of the caldera is filled with trachytic and phonolitic lava domes and flows that recently erupted within the caldera and along its ring fracture.  There are scoria cones and lava flows from the early Holocene on the north and south flanks of the volcano complex.  In the 19th and 20th centuries there have been explosive eruptions and lava flows from Teleki on the northern side and from Andrew's cone on the south side of Kakorinya. The last known eruption was in 1921.

See also
 List of volcanoes in Kenya

References

Sources

Polygenetic shield volcanoes
Volcanoes of Kenya
Active volcanoes